Tom Verlaine is the eponymous solo debut studio album by American musician and Television guitarist/vocalist Tom Verlaine. It was released in 1979 through Elektra Records.

Production
Several tracks, including "The Grip of Love", "Breakin' in My Heart", "Last Night", and "Red Leaves" trace their roots to unreleased Television songs. In the case of "Red Leaves", the verses are drawn from "Adventure", the unfinished title track of Television's 1978 album Adventure. Fred Smith, bassist for Television, also performs on the record. Ricky Wilson, at the time guitarist of the B-52's, plays guitar on "Breakin' in My Heart"; it is the only song Wilson recorded that did not involve other B-52's members.

David Bowie covered "Kingdom Come" the following year on Scary Monsters (And Super Creeps). Verlaine was originally set to play lead guitar on this version; however, Bowie was unhappy with his part and instead used King Crimson guitarist, Robert Fripp.

Mix variations
The album was originally mixed by Verlaine, but this mix was rejected by Elektra Records. Bob Clearmountain subsequently remixed the album, and it was this version that was released by Elektra in 1979. In 2002, a CD reissue by Collectors' Choice Music inadvertently used the earlier, rejected mix for initial pressings fulfilled by mail order; this was subsequently replaced with the approved Clearmountain mix by the time the CD was made available through traditional retail channels.

Reception

Tom Verlaine was ranked at number 15 among the top "Albums of the Year" for 1979 by NME.

Track listing
All songs written by Tom Verlaine.

Side one
 "The Grip of Love" – 3:58
 "Souvenir from a Dream" – 3:47
 "Kingdom Come" – 3:42
 "Mr. Bingo" – 3:57
 "Yonki Time" – 3:54

Side two
 "Flash Lightning" – 3:52
 "Red Leaves" – 2:49
 "Last Night" – 4:37
 "Breakin' in My Heart" – 6:06

Personnel
Tom Verlaine – guitar, vocals; organ on "Kingdom Come"
Fred Smith – bass, guitar, percussion, vocals
Jay Dee Daugherty – drums, percussion, vocals
Allan Schwartzberg – drums, percussion on "Kingdom Come"
Tom Thompson – drums on "Last Night"
Deerfrance – vocals on "Red Leaves"
Mark Abel – 12-string guitar on "Last Night"
Bruce Brody – piano on "Last Night"
Ricky Wilson – guitar on "Breakin' in My Heart"
Technical
Michael Ewasko – engineer
John Jansen – additional engineering on "Last Night"
Johnny Lee – art direction, design
Joel Brodsky – front cover photograph

References

Tom Verlaine albums
1979 debut albums
Elektra Records albums
Albums with cover art by Joel Brodsky